Lesnoy (masculine), Lesnaya (feminine), or Lesnoye (neuter) is the name of several inhabited localities in Russia.

Republic of Adygea
As of 2010, two rural localities in the Republic of Adygea bear this name:
Lesnoy, Giaginsky District, Republic of Adygea, a settlement in Giaginsky District
Lesnoy, Krasnogvardeysky District, Republic of Adygea, a settlement in Krasnogvardeysky District

Altai Krai
As of 2010, eight rural localities in Altai Krai bear this name:
Lesnoy, Barnaul, Altai Krai, a settlement in Vlasikhinskaya Settlement Administration of the city of krai significance of Barnaul
Lesnoy, Bobrovsky Selsoviet, Pervomaysky District, Altai Krai, a settlement in Bobrovsky Selsoviet of Pervomaysky District
Lesnoy, Borovikhinsky Selsoviet, Pervomaysky District, Altai Krai, a settlement in Borovikhinsky Selsoviet of Pervomaysky District
Lesnoy, Rebrikhinsky District, Altai Krai, a settlement in Panovsky Selsoviet of Rebrikhinsky District
Lesnoy, Troitsky District, Altai Krai, a settlement in Belovsky Selsoviet of Troitsky District
Lesnoye, Biysky District, Altai Krai, a selo in Lesnoy Selsoviet of Biysky District
Lesnoye, Burlinsky District, Altai Krai, a selo in Rozhkovsky Selsoviet of Burlinsky District
Lesnoye, Nemetsky natsionalny District, Altai Krai, a selo in Orlovsky Selsoviet of Nemetsky National District

Amur Oblast
As of 2010, one rural locality in Amur Oblast bears this name:
Lesnoy, Amur Oblast, a settlement under the administrative jurisdiction of Skovorodino Urban Settlement of Skovorodinsky District

Astrakhan Oblast
As of 2010, one rural locality in Astrakhan Oblast bears this name:
Lesnoye, Astrakhan Oblast, a selo in Olinsky Selsoviet of Limansky District

Republic of Bashkortostan
As of 2010, two rural localities in the Republic of Bashkortostan bear this name:
Lesnoy, Republic of Bashkortostan, a village in Milovsky Selsoviet of Ufimsky District
Lesnoye, Republic of Bashkortostan, a village in Skvorchikhinsky Selsoviet of Ishimbaysky District

Bryansk Oblast
As of 2010, two rural localities in Bryansk Oblast bear this name:
Lesnoye, Bryansky District, Bryansk Oblast, a selo in Steklyannoraditsky Selsoviet of Bryansky District
Lesnoye, Surazhsky District, Bryansk Oblast, a settlement in Kamensky Selsoviet of Surazhsky District

Republic of Buryatia
As of 2010, one rural locality in the Republic of Buryatia bears this name:
Lesnoy, Republic of Buryatia, a settlement in Zavodskoy Selsoviet of Tarbagataysky District

Chelyabinsk Oblast
As of 2010, five rural localities in Chelyabinsk Oblast bear this name:
Lesnoy, Kizilsky District, Chelyabinsk Oblast, a settlement in Put Oktyabrya Selsoviet of Kizilsky District
Lesnoy, Krasnoarmeysky District, Chelyabinsk Oblast, a settlement in Kozyrevsky Selsoviet of Krasnoarmeysky District
Lesnoy, Kunashaksky District, Chelyabinsk Oblast, a settlement in Kunashaksky Selsoviet of Kunashaksky District
Lesnoy, Uysky District, Chelyabinsk Oblast, a settlement in Sokolovsky Selsoviet of Uysky District
Lesnoy, Yetkulsky District, Chelyabinsk Oblast, a settlement in Belousovsky Selsoviet of Yetkulsky District

Chuvash Republic
As of 2010, four rural localities in the Chuvash Republic bear this name:
Lesnoy, Alatyrsky District, Chuvash Republic, a settlement in Altyshevskoye Rural Settlement of Alatyrsky District
Lesnoy, Kanashsky District, Chuvash Republic, a vyselok in Khuchelskoye Rural Settlement of Kanashsky District
Lesnoy, Yadrinsky District, Chuvash Republic, a settlement in Ivankovskoye Rural Settlement of Yadrinsky District
Lesnaya, Chuvash Republic, a village in Shtanashskoye Rural Settlement of Krasnochetaysky District

Irkutsk Oblast
As of 2010, two rural localities in Irkutsk Oblast bear this name:
Lesnoy, Kachugsky District, Irkutsk Oblast, a settlement in Kachugsky District
Lesnoy, Nizhneudinsky District, Irkutsk Oblast, a settlement in Nizhneudinsky District

Ivanovo Oblast
As of 2010, one rural locality in Ivanovo Oblast bears this name:
Lesnoye, Ivanovo Oblast, a village in Ivanovsky District

Kabardino-Balkar Republic
As of 2010, two rural localities in the Kabardino-Balkar Republic bear this name:
Lesnoye, Maysky District, Kabardino-Balkar Republic, a selo in Maysky District
Lesnoye, Prokhladnensky District, Kabardino-Balkar Republic, a selo in Prokhladnensky District

Kaliningrad Oblast
Modern rural localities
As of 2010, six rural localities in Kaliningrad Oblast bear this name:
Lesnoy, Kaliningrad Oblast, a settlement in Kurshsky Rural Okrug of Zelenogradsky District
Lesnoye, Chernyakhovsky District, Kaliningrad Oblast, a settlement in Svobodnensky Rural Okrug of Chernyakhovsky District
Lesnoye, Guryevsky District, Kaliningrad Oblast, a settlement in Novomoskovsky Rural Okrug of Guryevsky District
Lesnoye, Nemansky District, Kaliningrad Oblast, a settlement under the administrative jurisdiction of Neman Town of District Significance of Nemansky District
Lesnoye, Pravdinsky District, Kaliningrad Oblast, a settlement in Domnovsky Rural Okrug of Pravdinsky District
Lesnoye, Svetlogorsky District, Kaliningrad Oblast, a settlement under the administrative jurisdiction of the urban-type settlement of district significance of  Primorye, Svetlogorsky District

Historical names
Lesnoye, name of the settlement of imeni Alexandra Kosmodemyanskogo in 1946–1956; now under the jurisdiction of Oktyabrsky City District of the city of Kaliningrad

Kaluga Oblast
As of 2010, one rural locality in Kaluga Oblast bears this name:
Lesnoy, Kaluga Oblast, a settlement in Meshchovsky District

Kamchatka Krai
As of 2010, two rural localities in Kamchatka Krai bear this name:
Lesnoy, Kamchatka Krai, a settlement in Yelizovsky District
Lesnaya, Kamchatka Krai, a selo in Tigilsky District

Kemerovo Oblast
As of 2010, one rural locality in Kemerovo Oblast bears this name:
Lesnoy, Kemerovo Oblast, a settlement in Razdolnaya Rural Territory of Guryevsky District

Khabarovsk Krai
As of 2010, two rural localities in Khabarovsk Krai bear this name:
Lesnoy, Khabarovsk Krai, a settlement in Amursky District
Lesnoye, Khabarovsk Krai, a selo in Khabarovsky District

Kirov Oblast
As of 2010, one urban locality in Kirov Oblast bears this name:
Lesnoy, Kirov Oblast, an urban-type settlement in Verkhnekamsky District

Kostroma Oblast
As of 2010, one rural locality in Kostroma Oblast bears this name:
Lesnoy, Kostroma Oblast, a settlement in Voronskoye Settlement of Sudislavsky District

Krasnodar Krai
As of 2010, three rural localities in Krasnodar Krai bear this name:
Lesnoy, Belorechensky District, Krasnodar Krai, a settlement in Pshekhsky Rural Okrug of Belorechensky District
Lesnoy, Uspensky District, Krasnodar Krai, a settlement in Veselovsky Rural Okrug of Uspensky District
Lesnoye, Krasnodar Krai, a selo in Moldovsky Rural Okrug of Sochi

Kurgan Oblast
As of 2010, three rural localities in Kurgan Oblast bear this name:
Lesnoy, Kurgan Oblast, a settlement in Markovsky Selsoviet of Ketovsky District
Lesnoye, Kurgan Oblast, a village in Zauralsky Selsoviet of Kargapolsky District
Lesnaya, Kurgan Oblast, a village in Trusilovsky Selsoviet of Shumikhinsky District

Kursk Oblast
As of 2010, one rural locality in Kursk Oblast bears this name:
Lesnoy, Kursk Oblast, a settlement in Nevarsky Selsoviet of Dmitriyevsky District

Leningrad Oblast
As of 2010, two rural localities in Leningrad Oblast bear this name:
Lesnoy, Leningrad Oblast, a logging depot settlement in Zaboryevskoye Settlement Municipal Formation of Boksitogorsky District
Lesnoye, Leningrad Oblast, a logging depot settlement in Kuyvozovskoye Settlement Municipal Formation of Vsevolozhsky District

Mari El Republic
As of 2010, three rural localities in the Mari El Republic bear this name:
Lesnoy, Mari-Tureksky District, Mari El Republic, a settlement in Mari-Bilyamorsky Rural Okrug of Mari-Tureksky District
Lesnoy, Kuyarsky Rural Okrug, Medvedevsky District, Mari El Republic, a settlement in Kuyarsky Rural Okrug of Medvedevsky District
Lesnoy, Shoybulaksky Rural Okrug, Medvedevsky District, Mari El Republic, a settlement in Shoybulaksky Rural Okrug of Medvedevsky District

Republic of Mordovia
As of 2010, two rural localities in the Republic of Mordovia bear this name:
Lesnoy, Bolsheignatovsky District, Republic of Mordovia, a settlement in Protasovsky Selsoviet of Bolsheignatovsky District
Lesnoy, Zubovo-Polyansky District, Republic of Mordovia, a settlement under the administrative jurisdiction of the work settlement of Yavas, Zubovo-Polyansky District

Moscow Oblast
As of 2010, six inhabited localities in Moscow Oblast bear this name.

Urban localities
Lesnoy, Pushkinsky District, Moscow Oblast, a work settlement in Pushkinsky District

Rural localities
Lesnoy, Dmitrovsky District, Moscow Oblast, a settlement in Kulikovskoye Rural Settlement of Dmitrovsky District
Lesnoy, Klinsky District, Moscow Oblast, a settlement in Nudolskoye Rural Settlement of Klinsky District
Lesnoy, Kolomensky District, Moscow Oblast, a settlement in Biorkovskoye Rural Settlement of Kolomensky District
Lesnoye, Lukhovitsky District, Moscow Oblast, a village in Dedinovskoye Rural Settlement of Lukhovitsky District
Lesnoye, Mozhaysky District, Moscow Oblast, a settlement in Klementyevskoye Rural Settlement of Mozhaysky District

Nizhny Novgorod Oblast
As of 2010, four rural localities in Nizhny Novgorod Oblast bear this name:
Lesnoy, Dzerzhinsk, Nizhny Novgorod Oblast, a cordon in Pyra Selsoviet of the city of oblast significance of Dzerzhinsk
Lesnoy, Bogorodsky District, Nizhny Novgorod Oblast, a settlement in Khvoshchevsky Selsoviet of Bogorodsky District
Lesnoy, Sokolsky District, Nizhny Novgorod Oblast, a settlement in Mezhdurechensky Selsoviet of Sokolsky District
Lesnaya, Nizhny Novgorod Oblast, a village in Smolkovsky Selsoviet of Gorodetsky District

Novgorod Oblast
As of 2010, three rural localities in Novgorod Oblast bear this name:
Lesnoy, Novgorod Oblast, a settlement in Pesskoye Settlement of Khvoyninsky District
Lesnaya, Novgorodsky District, Novgorod Oblast, a village in Lesnovskoye Settlement of Novgorodsky District
Lesnaya, Volotovsky District, Novgorod Oblast, a village in Gorskoye Settlement of Volotovsky District

Novosibirsk Oblast
As of 2010, one rural locality in Novosibirsk Oblast bears this name:
Lesnoy, Novosibirsk Oblast, a settlement in Kochenyovsky District

Omsk Oblast
As of 2010, four rural localities in Omsk Oblast bear this name:
Lesnoy, Isilkulsky District, Omsk Oblast, a settlement in Lesnoy Rural Okrug of Isilkulsky District
Lesnoy, Lyubinsky District, Omsk Oblast, a settlement in Yuzhno-Lyubinsky Rural Okrug of Lyubinsky District
Lesnoy, Nizhneomsky District, Omsk Oblast, a settlement in Pautovsky Rural Okrug of Nizhneomsky District
Lesnoye, Omsk Oblast, a selo in Sosnovsky Rural Okrug of Tavrichesky District

Orenburg Oblast
As of 2010, two rural localities in Orenburg Oblast bear this name:
Lesnoy, Abdulinsky District, Orenburg Oblast, a settlement in Pervomaysky Selsoviet of Abdulinsky District
Lesnoy, Kuvandyksky District, Orenburg Oblast, a settlement in Novosarinsky Selsoviet of Kuvandyksky District

Oryol Oblast
As of 2010, two rural localities in Oryol Oblast bear this name:
Lesnoy, Oryol Oblast, a settlement in Platonovsky Selsoviet of Orlovsky District
Lesnaya, Oryol Oblast, a village in Bolshekulikovsky Selsoviet of Orlovsky District

Penza Oblast
As of 2010, five rural localities in Penza Oblast bear this name:
Lesnoy, Gorodishchensky District, Penza Oblast, a settlement in Arkhangelsky Selsoviet of Gorodishchensky District
Lesnoy, Kolyshleysky District, Penza Oblast, a settlement in Berezovsky Selsoviet of Kolyshleysky District
Lesnoy, Shemysheysky District, Penza Oblast, a settlement under the administrative jurisdiction of the work settlement of Shemysheyka, Shemysheysky District
Lesnoy, Vadinsky District, Penza Oblast, a settlement in Sergo-Polivanovsky Selsoviet of Vadinsky District
Lesnoye, Penza Oblast, a selo in Proletarsky Selsoviet of Zemetchinsky District

Perm Krai
As of 2010, one rural locality in Perm Krai bears this name:
Lesnoy, Perm Krai, a settlement in Osinsky District

Primorsky Krai
As of 2010, one rural locality in Primorsky Krai bears this name:
Lesnoye, Primorsky Krai, a selo under the administrative jurisdiction of Lesozavodsk City Under Krai Jurisdiction

Pskov Oblast
As of 2010, three rural localities in Pskov Oblast bear this name:
Lesnaya, Gdovsky District, Pskov Oblast, a village in Gdovsky District
Lesnaya, Palkinsky District, Pskov Oblast, a village in Palkinsky District
Lesnaya, Pskovsky District, Pskov Oblast, a village in Pskovsky District

Rostov Oblast
As of 2010, five rural localities in Rostov Oblast bear this name:
Lesnoy, Dubovsky District, Rostov Oblast, a khutor in Barabanshchikovskoye Rural Settlement of Dubovsky District
Lesnoy, Kamensky District, Rostov Oblast, a khutor in Starostanichnoye Rural Settlement of Kamensky District
Lesnoy, Martynovsky District, Rostov Oblast, a khutor in Maloorlovskoye Rural Settlement of Martynovsky District
Lesnoy, Matveyevo-Kurgansky District, Rostov Oblast, a khutor in Malokirsanovskoye Rural Settlement of Matveyevo-Kurgansky District
Lesnoy, Tatsinsky District, Rostov Oblast, a khutor in Verkhneoblivskoye Rural Settlement of Tatsinsky District

Ryazan Oblast
As of 2010, two inhabited localities in Ryazan Oblast bear this name.

Urban localities
Lesnoy, Shilovsky District, Ryazan Oblast, a work settlement in Shilovsky District

Rural localities
Lesnoy, Kasimovsky District, Ryazan Oblast, a settlement in Siversky Rural Okrug of Kasimovsky District

Sakhalin Oblast
As of 2010, one rural locality in Sakhalin Oblast bears this name:
Lesnoye, Sakhalin Oblast, a selo in Korsakovsky District

Samara Oblast
As of 2010, two rural localities in Samara Oblast bear this name:
Lesnoy, Borsky District, Samara Oblast, a settlement in Borsky District
Lesnoy, Isaklinsky District, Samara Oblast, a settlement in Isaklinsky District

Saratov Oblast
As of 2010, three rural localities in Saratov Oblast bear this name:
Lesnoy, Dergachyovsky District, Saratov Oblast, a settlement in Dergachyovsky District
Lesnoy, Yershovsky District, Saratov Oblast, a settlement in Yershovsky District
Lesnoye, Saratov Oblast, a selo in Balashovsky District

Smolensk Oblast
As of 2010, two rural localities in Smolensk Oblast bear this name:
Lesnoy, Smolensk Oblast, a settlement in Borkovskoye Rural Settlement of Demidovsky District
Lesnoye, Smolensk Oblast, a selo in Vadinskoye Rural Settlement of Safonovsky District

Sverdlovsk Oblast
As of 2010, two inhabited localities in Sverdlovsk Oblast bear this name.

Urban localities
Lesnoy, Sverdlovsk Oblast, a town under the administrative jurisdiction of the closed administrative-territorial formation of the same name

Rural localities
Lesnoy, Irbitsky District, Sverdlovsk Oblast, a settlement in Irbitsky District

Tambov Oblast
As of 2010, two rural localities in Tambov Oblast bear this name:
Lesnoy, Kirsanovsky District, Tambov Oblast, a settlement in Uvarovshchinsky Selsoviet of Kirsanovsky District
Lesnoy, Tambovsky District, Tambov Oblast, a settlement under the administrative jurisdiction of Novolyadinsky Settlement Council of Tambovsky District

Republic of Tatarstan
As of 2010, one rural locality in the Republic of Tatarstan bears this name:
Lesnoy, Republic of Tatarstan, a settlement in Tyulyachinsky District

Tula Oblast
As of 2010, four rural localities in Tula Oblast bear this name:
Lesnoy, Dubensky District, Tula Oblast, a settlement in Gvardeysky Rural Okrug of Dubensky District
Lesnoy, Leninsky District, Tula Oblast, a settlement in Zaytsevsky Rural Okrug of Leninsky District
Lesnoy, Shchyokinsky District, Tula Oblast, a settlement in Krapivenskaya Rural Administration of Shchyokinsky District
Lesnoy, Uzlovsky District, Tula Oblast, a settlement in Kamenskaya Rural Administration of Uzlovsky District

Tver Oblast
As of 2010, five rural localities in Tver Oblast bear this name:
Lesnoy, Firovsky District, Tver Oblast, a settlement in Firovsky District
Lesnoy, Kimrsky District, Tver Oblast, a settlement in Kimrsky District
Lesnoye, Tver Oblast, a selo in Lesnoy District
Lesnaya, Toropetsky District, Tver Oblast, a village in Toropetsky District
Lesnaya, Torzhoksky District, Tver Oblast, a village in Torzhoksky District

Tyumen Oblast
As of 2010, three rural localities in Tyumen Oblast bear this name:
Lesnoy, Abatsky District, Tyumen Oblast, a settlement in Leninsky Rural Okrug of Abatsky District
Lesnoy, Zavodoukovsky District, Tyumen Oblast, a settlement in Zavodoukovsky District
Lesnoye, Tyumen Oblast, a selo in Lesnoy Rural Okrug of Yurginsky District

Udmurt Republic
As of 2010, one rural locality in the Udmurt Republic bears this name:
Lesnoy, Udmurt Republic, a village in Melnikovsky Selsoviet of Mozhginsky District

Ulyanovsk Oblast
As of 2010, two rural localities in Ulyanovsk Oblast bear this name:
Lesnoy, Melekessky District, Ulyanovsk Oblast, a settlement under the administrative jurisdiction of Mullovsky Settlement Okrug of Melekessky District
Lesnoy, Sengileyevsky District, Ulyanovsk Oblast, a settlement in Novoslobodsky Rural Okrug of Sengileyevsky District

Vladimir Oblast
As of 2010, one rural locality in Vladimir Oblast bears this name:
Lesnaya, Vladimir Oblast, a village in Gus-Khrustalny District

Volgograd Oblast
As of 2010, one rural locality in Volgograd Oblast bears this name:
Lesnoy, Volgograd Oblast, a khutor in Sarpinsky Selsoviet of Volgograd

Vologda Oblast
As of 2010, one rural locality in Vologda Oblast bears this name:
Lesnoye, Vologda Oblast, a settlement in Domozerovsky Selsoviet of Cherepovetsky District

Yaroslavl Oblast
As of 2010, one rural locality in Yaroslavl Oblast bears this name:
Lesnoy, Yaroslavl Oblast, a settlement in Lyubilkovsky Rural Okrug of Rostovsky District

Zabaykalsky Krai
As of 2010, one rural locality in Zabaykalsky Krai bears this name:
Lesnaya, Zabaykalsky Krai, a settlement at the station in Chitinsky District